Valdoule is a commune in the department of Hautes-Alpes, southeastern France. The municipality was established on 1 July 2017 by merger of the former communes of Bruis (the seat), Montmorin and Sainte-Marie.

See also 
Communes of the Hautes-Alpes department

References 

Communes of Hautes-Alpes

Communes nouvelles of Hautes-Alpes
Populated places established in 2017
2017 establishments in France